Beverly Ada Mary Osu  (born 27 September 1992) is a Nigerian video vixen, model and actress. She is predominantly known for her roles in several films and for her participation in the 8th season of Big Brother Africa. Osu won Model of the Year at the 2011 Dynamix All Youth Awards.

Early life and education
Osu, who is originally from Delta State, was born in Lagos State, in southwestern Nigeria. Osu attained her primary education from Daughters of Divine Love Convent, a school located in Enugu State. In a bid to obtain her B.Sc. degree, she applied to Babcock University, where she was granted admission to study mass communication. However, she transferred to the National Open University of Nigeria and earned her mass communication degree there.

Big Brother Africa (Season 8)
In 2013, Osu represented Nigeria in season 8 of Big Brother Africa, becoming the only contestant ever not to have been nominated for possible eviction.

Career

Video vixen and modeling career 
Osu's overall career received mainstream recognition due to her participation in the Big Brother Africa reality TV show but however Osu debuted her career in the Nigerian entertainment industry as a model and in 2011, she won the award for model of the year at the Dynamix awards. Osu as a video vixen has been in the music videos of notable Nigerian musicians most notably appearing in music videos of Ice Prince  in the song titled Oleku, Terry da rapman in the song titled Boys are not smiling, Djinee in the song titled Over killing and Kizz Daniel in the song titled Madu.

Acting career
Osu debuted her acting career a year after the Big Brother Africa season 8 was concluded. Osu in 2014 received her first movie role and was featured in the movie titled Curse Of The Seven where she featured alongside Nollywood actor Ken Erics.

Awards
Osu in 2011 won the Nigerian Top Video Vixen Award at the Dynamix Awards and in the same year won the award for Model of the Year at the Dynamix Awards.

Personal life
At a young age Osu wanted to become a Reverend sister and enrolled in a convent school in Enugu State. Osu later abandoned this aspiration.

Filmography

Films (partial)
The Family (2019)
Chief Daddy (2018), as Sandra Bello
Zena (2018), as Pohila
Òlòtūré (2019), as Peju
A Soldiers Story: Return From The Dead, as Baby
Curse Of The Seven (2014)
Your Excellency (2019)
Nneka The Pretty Serpent (2020)
Creepy Lives Here (2021)
Progressive Tailors Club (2021)
Unintentional (2021)
Chief Daddy 2: Going for Broke

Television
Jenifa's Diary

References

External links
IMDb Page Of Beverly Osu

Living people
21st-century Nigerian actresses
Igbo actresses
Babcock University alumni
1992 births
Nigerian film actresses
Nigerian female models
People from Delta State
National Open University of Nigeria alumni
Nigerian television personalities